William Fong (born 14 November 1960) is a Samoan hurdler. He competed in the men's 110 metres hurdles at the 1984 Summer Olympics.

References

1960 births
Living people
Athletes (track and field) at the 1984 Summer Olympics
Samoan male hurdlers
Olympic athletes of Samoa
Athletes (track and field) at the 1982 Commonwealth Games
Commonwealth Games competitors for Samoa
Place of birth missing (living people)